São Mamede can refer to:

 São Mamede (Batalha), a parish in Batalha, Portugal
 São Mamede (Lisbon), a parish in Lisbon, Portugal
 São Mamede (Paraíba), a town in Paraíba, Brazil
 São Mamede de Este, a Portuguese parish
 São Mamede de Infesta, a Portuguese city
 Battle of São Mamede